Julius Frazier Peppers (born January 18, 1980) is an American former professional football player who was a defensive end and outside linebacker in the National Football League (NFL). After rejoining the Panthers for the 2017 season, he retired after the 2018 NFL season.

Peppers was named to the Pro Bowl nine times, and both the first and second All-Pro teams three times each. He was named to the 2000s and NFL 2010s All-Decade Teams.

Early years
Peppers was born in Wilson, North Carolina, and raised in nearby Bailey. He attended Bailey Elementary School, Southern Nash Middle School, and finally Southern Nash Senior High School where he played football for Coach Ray Davis. When Peppers arrived at Southern Nash his Freshman year Davis felt that Peppers would be an asset on the gridiron for the Firebirds, despite the fact that Peppers had never played football before. Davis's gamble would pay off. During his high school career, Peppers played running back and defensive lineman, finished his career with 3,501 rushing yards and 46 touchdowns, and was one of the most dangerous defensive linemen in the state. He also lettered in basketball and was voted all-conference as a power forward for four consecutive years. In 1998, Southern Nash won the state championship in track for the first time in the school's history. Peppers contributed as a sprinter, winning the state championship in the 4×400 meter team relay (3:23.10 minutes) and finishing second as a triple jumper (14.05 meters). He was also rumored to have cleared 2.03 meters in the high jump. During his senior year (1997–98), he was named to the Parade magazine high school All-America team in football as an all-purpose talent and was also named Male Athlete of the Year by the North Carolina High School Athletic Association. In 2005, Peppers was named by the Rocky Mount Telegram newspaper as one of the 50 Greatest Athletes from the Twin County (Nash and Edgecombe) area.

College career
Peppers attended the University of North Carolina at Chapel Hill, where he played defensive end for the Tar Heels from 1998 to 2001. As a true freshman in 1998, he was redshirted. Peppers led the nation with 15 quarterback sacks during his sophomore season (2000), and earned first-team All-Atlantic Coast Conference (ACC) and second-team All-American honors. Following his junior season in 2001, he was a first-team All-ACC selection and was recognized as a unanimous first-team All-American. He also won the Chuck Bednarik Award as the nation's top defensive player and the Lombardi Award as the best collegiate lineman and the Bill Willis Trophy as the nation's best defensive lineman. In the three seasons at North Carolina, Peppers started 33 of the 34 games in which he played. He is currently ranked second all-time in UNC history with 30.5 sacks. He accumulated 53 stops behind the line of scrimmage, 167 tackles, 5 interceptions, 2 fumble recoveries, 5 forced fumbles, 13 passes deflected, and 42 quarterback pressures (hurries) and returned 2 interceptions and 1 fumble recovery for touchdowns.

Basketball
While at the University of North Carolina, Peppers was also a walk-on member of the men's basketball team. The North Carolina football coach, Carl Torbush, said he could play football and then be a walk-on for Bill Guthridge on the North Carolina men's basketball team. He was a reserve on the 1999–2000 Tar Heels team that made it to the Final Four. Peppers was also a reserve on the 2000–01 men's basketball team. In the NCAA Tournament, Peppers scored 21 points and grabbed 10 rebounds in a loss to Penn State in the second round. After the season, Peppers decided to focus solely on football and did not play basketball in his final season.

Awards and honors
 Sporting News Freshman All-American (1999)
 First-team All-ACC (2000)
 Second-team Associated Press All-American (2000)
 Second-team Football News All-American (2000)
 Division I-A sacks leader (2000)
 First-team All-ACC (2001)
 Consensus All-American (2001)
 Chuck Bednarik Award (2001)
 Bill Willis Trophy (2001)
 Lombardi Award (2001)

Professional career

Peppers was a highly regarded prospect coming into the 2002 NFL draft earning comparisons to Hall of Famer Lawrence Taylor for his ability to dominate a football game. Peppers would end up being selected number 2 overall in the 2002 NFL Draft by the Carolina Panthers behind number 1 overall pick, quarterback David Carr.

Carolina Panthers

2002 season

On September 8, 2002 against the Baltimore Ravens, Peppers played in his first career NFL game, in which he made an impact by deflecting a pass by Ravens quarterback Chris Redman that was intercepted by linebacker Dan Morgan, who proceeded to race 22 yards down field with under two minutes remaining in the game to preserve the victory; the Panthers won the game by a score of 10–7.

In Peppers' second career NFL game, which came on September 15, 2002 against the Detroit Lions, he lived up to his billing with three sacks and a forced fumble for Carolina. Peppers also had five tackles including one for a loss, and a deflected pass.

Peppers, the second overall pick in the draft, got his first NFL sack early in the first quarter. He got another a few minutes later, and registered his third on the final play of the first half when he drilled Lions quarterback Mike McMahon from behind, knocking the ball loose and leaving McMahon motionless on the ground for several moments. The game ended up being a 31–7 rout of the Lions.

Later that season, in a 14–13 loss against the Dallas Cowboys in week 6, Peppers produced three tackles, three sacks, one forced fumble, one pass defensed, and an interception of Cowboys quarterback Quincy Carter that he returned 21 yards, before lateralling the ball to linebacker Mark Fields, who gained an additional 30 yards. Peppers' second three-sack outing of the year tied the NFL rookie record for three-sack games in a season, set by Leslie O'Neal of the San Diego Chargers in 1986.

Peppers during his rookie season also helped the Panthers boast the only defensive unit since the NFL merger in 1970 to improve from last in the league in total defense to second in one season. Peppers would finish his rookie season with 28 solo tackles, 7 assisted tackles, 12 sacks, 5 forced fumbles, 1 interception, 5 passes defensed, and 3 stuffs. For his efforts Peppers would earn the NFL Rookie of the Month Award in October 2002 and the 2002 Associated Press NFL Defensive Rookie of the Year Award. With four games remaining in the season, Peppers was suspended for violating the NFL's substance abuse policy for taking a banned dietary supplement. Peppers would go on to say that he was given a dietary supplement by a friend to help him fight off fatigue. The pills contained an ephedra substance that was banned by the NFL. Peppers said it was an honest mistake on his part and that he would be more cautious in the future.

2003 season
In Peppers second season, he was part of a defensive line that also included Brentson Buckner, Kris Jenkins, and Mike Rucker. Together, the unit would be a key cog that would help the Panthers reach the Super Bowl. Peppers would finish the season with 37 solo tackles, 7 assisted tackles, 7 sacks, three forced fumbles, 3 passes defensed, 4 stuffs, and 1 blocked kick.

In the wild card round playoff game against the Dallas Cowboys, Peppers would make a couple of extraordinary highlight reel plays. In the first quarter, Peppers would chase down Cowboys Receiver Joey Galloway who was one of the fastest players in NFL history, and run him out of bounds after a 28-yard gain. And then later in the fourth quarter as the Cowboys were trying to mount a comeback, Peppers would intercept Dallas Quarterback Quincy Carter and return it 34 yards to the Cowboys 11 yard line. Peppers recorded 1 tackle, 1 interception, and 1 pass defensed in the game. The Panthers won the game 29–10. In the divisional round against the St. Louis Rams, Peppers would again have a dominant performance by recording a sack, 2 passes defensed, and 4 tackles, one of which came on a shuffle pass in the second quarter to running back Marshall Faulk. The game would go into double overtime, as the Panthers defeated the Rams 29–23. The next week in the NFC Championship game against the Philadelphia Eagles, Peppers would record 2 tackles in helping to lead a dominant defensive performance for the Panthers as they held the Eagles to just 3 points. Panthers would win by a score of 14–3.

The Panthers reached the Super Bowl for the first time in franchise history and matched up against the New England Patriots, the game would be an instant classic as both teams went back and forth throughout the game. Peppers would record 2 tackles and pressure New England QB Tom Brady all throughout the game. On the first defensive snap of the game for the Panthers, Peppers stormed into the Patriots backfield with a speed rush from his left Defensive End spot pressuring and hitting Tom Brady right as Brady released the ball for a completion to WR Deion Branch. Two plays later on the Pats opening drive Peppers was cut blocked by Patriots Offensive Tackle Tom Ashworth, but Peppers recovered quickly and nearly deflected the pass as it whizzed by. On the very next play Peppers again ripped into the Patriots backfield along with blitzing Panthers linebacker Dan Morgan hurrying Tom Brady into a rushed throw for an incompletion, and then again on the following play Peppers man handled Tom Ashworth with a hump move made famous by former great Defensive End Reggie White, as Peppers tossed Ashworth to the side like a rag doll, leaped into the air with both arms up and hit Tom Brady altering his hurried throw for an incompletion. The Patriots missed a field goal on their opening drive. On the next Patriots possession Peppers helped force a three and out by pushing Pats Running Back Kevin Faulk to the ground, who was assigned to block him on the third down play, and then leaped into the air to alter Brady's pass as it was completed short of the first down marker. On a play towards the end of the first half with 32 seconds remaining on the clock, Peppers exploded off the line of scrimmage exhibiting great speed and power, rushing against a double team, and drove both the tackle and guard back towards Brady narrowly missing out on a sack, as Brady just did side step him. On the Panthers first defensive snap of the second half, Peppers shrugged aside the New England Tight End Christian Fauria to tackle Running Back Antowain Smith after a gain of just one yard. On the Patriots second possession of the second half, on third down and 5, Peppers bull rushed Ashworth right at Brady and nicked Brady on the helmet with his left hand just after Brady released the ball, the pass was completed for a first down. After the play sports commentator Phil Simms commented that Peppers "was a star waiting to happen." On the same drive, second down and 6, on a running play by the Patriots Peppers tossed Ashworth to the ground as he was in good position defending against the run, the tackle was made by the Panthers defense for a short gain. In a play early in the fourth quarter, Peppers dropped into coverage and made a tackle on Receiver Troy Brown. On a third and goal play in the fourth quarter with 7:48 remaining on the clock, Patriots leading 21-16, Peppers bull rushed Ashworth and pushed him to the ground, as Peppers was closing in on Brady fellow Defensive End Al Wallace got to Brady sooner and forced Brady into a hurried throw that was intercepted by Cornerback Reggie Howard. On the first play of the next Patriots possession, Peppers dominated Ashworth yet again, bull rushing him back into Tom Brady nearly getting a sack on the play, as he and fellow Panthers Defensive End Mike Rucker hurried Brady into a quick throw which he completed for a 1 yard gain. On the Patriots final drive of the game near the end of the fourth quarter, on the Pats first snap Peppers used an outside speed rush to get around Ashworth and hit Tom Brady knocking him to the ground just as he released the hurried throw for an incompletion. Peppers was double team blocked for the remainder of the Patriots final possession. Peppers was a highly disruptive force all throughout Super Bowl XXXVIII.

With 1:08 remaining in the game, and the score tied 29-29, the Patriots were given a short field when Panthers kicker John Kasay kicked the ball out of bounds on the kickoff, giving the Patriots the ball at their own 40 yard line with just over a minute left and three timeouts to use. Brady got the Patriots down the field into field goal range, and Pats kicker Adam Vinatieri kicked a 41 yard field goal through the uprights with 4 seconds remaining for the victory. It was a crushing defeat for Peppers and the Panthers but they fought hard until the final whistle. The Patriots went on to win their 2nd Super Bowl title in 3 years.

Peppers and Donovan McNabb were the only people to ever play in both the NCAA men's basketball Final Four and the NFL's Super Bowl.

2004 season
On October 10, 2004 versus the Denver Broncos, on third-and-3, he was fooled on the play at first but recovered in time to push Broncos quarterback Jake Plummer out of bounds on a bootleg after a 2-yard gain. Then on fourth-and-1, he intercepted Plummer's pass and ran it back 97 yards which was an NFL record for a defensive lineman. Peppers would record 4 tackles, 1 interception, and 1 pass defensed in a losing effort to the Broncos by a score of 17–20.

In a game against the Tampa Bay Buccaneers in Week 12, Peppers produced one of the NFL's most dominant performances of the season by blocking a 26-yard field goal attempt, recording a 46-yard interception return for a touchdown, which was Peppers first career touchdown scored and was the first interception returned for a touchdown by a defensive lineman in Carolina Panthers history. Also recorded 1 pass defensed, 1 sack and 4 tackles including one stop in which he chased down Bucs running back Michael Pittman from behind on a 68-yard screen pass in the second quarter. The Panthers would defeat the Bucs 21–14.

Peppers would also make a memorable play in Week 15 against the Atlanta Falcons, which was a Saturday night game held on December 18, 2004, Peppers would grab a fumble in midair by Atlanta Falcons quarterback Michael Vick and race 60 yards the other way for a Panthers touchdown. Peppers also harassed and chased Michael Vick all over the field during the game as he recorded 3 tackles one being for a loss of yards, 1 pass defensed and the 60 yard fumble recovery for a touchdown. Peppers would also line up as a wide receiver in the red zone towards the end of the second quarter, and catch a pass just outside the end zone, that if thrown more accurately by Panthers quarterback Jake Delhomme would have resulted in a touchdown catch for Peppers. It was a hard-fought game with the Falcons but the Panthers would lose in the end by a score of 34–31.

Peppers would also set an NFL record by recording 143 total interception return yards which is the most ever recorded in a single season by a defensive lineman. He also had a combined 203 interception and fumble return yards which is the most ever by a defensive lineman in a single season since the NFL merger in 1970.

Peppers would finish the season with 52 solo tackles, 12 assisted tackles, 11 sacks, 4 forced fumbles, 1 fumble recovery, 2 interceptions, 9 passes defensed, 4 stuffs, 1 blocked kick, and 2 defensive touchdowns.

For his accomplishments Peppers was named to his first NFL Pro Bowl while also earning a spot on the NFL's All Pro First-Team. Peppers would also be named the NFC Defensive Player of the Month in November 2004 and finished fourth overall in the voting by the Associated Press for the AP NFL Defensive Player of the Year Award. He would also be named the NFC Defensive player of the Year by the Kansas City Committee, as well as the NFL Alumni Defensive Lineman of the Year.

2005 season
Peppers broke a bone in his right hand in the sixth game of the season against the Lions, but would return to the game with a cast and help the Panthers get a win 21–20. He would play the next few games with a cast on his hand. Peppers would record two impressive 3 sack games during the season, one against the Tampa Bay Buccaneers in Week 9, in which addition to his 3 sacks, Peppers also recorded 5 tackles.

His other 3 sack effort came against the Dallas Cowboys in Week 16, in this game Peppers also recorded 8 tackles, 1 pass defensed, and 1 blocked kick. Peppers was an absolute menace and was all over the field for the Panthers defense, but despite Peppers efforts, the Panthers would lose the game 20–24.

For the season Peppers recorded 38 solo tackles, 12 assisted tackles, 10.5 sacks, 2 forced fumbles, 1 fumble recovery, 6 passes defensed, 5 stuffs, and 1 blocked kick. Peppers would make his second Pro Bowl for his efforts.

In the wild card round of the playoffs, Peppers was part of defensive effort that held scoreless the New York Giants offense that ranked third in the NFL in points per game. The Giants managed just 132 yards total offense. Panthers became the first team to register a shutout on the road in the playoffs since 1980 when the Los Angeles Rams posted a 9-0 victory at Tampa Bay (1/5/80) in the 1979 NFC Championship. Carolina shutout was third in team history. Panthers coach John Fox had Carolina prepared for everything New York attempted, rattling Eli Manning into four turnovers and sacking him 4 times, pressuring him throughout the game en route to a 23-0 victory. Peppers contributed 2 tackles, 1 sack, and 1 pass defensed.

In the divisional round against the Chicago Bears, Peppers hurt his shoulder while driving Bears running back Thomas Jones out of bounds near the goal line in the fourth quarter. Peppers went to the locker room after the play, then returned to the bench but not the game. Peppers recorded 3 tackles and helped the Panthers get the win 29-21.

In the NFC Championship Game, against the Seattle Seahawks Peppers would play well with a hurt shoulder and record 6 tackles 1 being for a loss of yards, but the Panthers would lose the game 34–14, and miss out on a chance to play in the Super Bowl.

2006 season
Peppers would again record two three-sack games during the season, his first against the Minnesota Vikings in Week 2, in which he recorded 8 tackles, 3 sacks, 1 stuff, 1 pass defensed, and 1 blocked kick.

In week 3 against the Cleveland Browns, Peppers, who was playing with a sore ankle, would be a nightmare all game long for QB Charlie Frye and the Browns offensive line. Throughout the game Peppers would record 5 tackles one being for a loss of yards, a sack, forced fumble, fumble recovery on the same play, 5 other QB hits and a pass defensed in which Peppers made an extremely athletic play. Browns fullback Lawrence Vickers took a handoff right but pulled up to pass the ball, Peppers, playing left end, read the play before it began to develop, sprinted downfield and tipped the ball away from tight end Kellen Winslow II. Peppers dominant play helped the Panthers defeat the Browns 20-12.

In Week 6 against the Baltimore Ravens, Peppers became the Panthers' all-time sacks leader after registering 2 sacks during the game. Peppers also had 8 tackles and a forced fumble in yet another game that Peppers looked like the most dominant defensive player in the NFL. .

In Week 10 against the Tampa Bay Buccaneers, Peppers recorded 4 tackles, 3 sacks, 1 pass defensed, and one fumble recovery in helping to defeat the Buccaneers 24–10. Peppers was so dominant in the game that ESPN Monday Night Football analyst Joe Theismann compared him to Lawrence Taylor, whom Joe had played against while he was a Quarterback for the Washington Redskins, and Taylor a Linebacker for the New York Giants. Taylor ended Theismann's career when he broke his right leg during a Monday Night Football game in 1985.

Peppers earned the NFC Defensive Player of the Month Award for the month of October 2006, his second such award. Peppers finished the season with 49 solo tackles, 9 assisted tackles, 13 sacks, 3 forced fumbles, 2 fumble recoveries, 6 passes defensed, 7 stuffs, and 2 blocked kicks. For his efforts, Peppers earned a trip to his third consecutive Pro Bowl and was also named NFL First-Team All Pro for the second time in his career.

2007 season
Following Panthers safety Mike Minter's retirement after the 2006 season, Peppers was named as the Panthers defensive captain. Peppers had a down season in 2007 after only recording 30 solo tackles, 8 assisted tackles, 2.5 sacks, 3 forced fumbles, 2 fumble recoveries, 1 interception, 5 passes defensed, 1 stuff, and 2 blocked kicks. Before the season started, Peppers suffered from an undisclosed illness and lost weight, which is assumed to have played a part in his down season. Peppers also missed the final two games of the season with a sprained MCL in his right knee.

2008 season
The 2008 season was a bounce back year for Peppers who reverted to his usual dominant self after recording a career-high 14.5 sacks. Peppers would change from left defensive end to right defensive end before the season, which was the position he played in college at the University of North Carolina. Julius’ best performance of the season came against the Oakland Raiders in Week 10, a game in which he recorded 7 tackles, 3 sacks, 2 forced fumbles, and 1 pass defensed, Peppers moved all along the defensive line and dominated against the Raiders, leading the Panthers to a 17–6 victory. He would earn his second NFC Defensive Player of the Week Award after his performance.

Peppers finished the season with 40 solo tackles, 11 assisted tackles, 14.5 sacks, 5 forced fumbles, 5 passes defensed, 4 stuffs, and 1 blocked kick. After the season, Peppers earned a spot on the NFC Pro Bowl team, which was the fourth of his career. He also earned Second-Team All Pro honors. The Panthers made the playoffs after the 2008 NFL regular season but lost in the divisional round to the Arizona Cardinals by a score of 33–13. On January 16, 2009, ESPN reported that Peppers told ESPN's Chris Mortensen he did not intend to re-sign a long-term deal with the Panthers and would like to explore options with another team, specifically one with a 3-4 defensive formation. He also expressed the desire or willingness to convert from a defensive end to an outside linebacker. Peppers said he would request a trade if franchise tagged. However, despite his request, the Panthers would place the Franchise tag on him on February 19.

2009 season
The 2009 season ended Peppers' first stint with the Panthers. Peppers began the season well by recording 5 tackles, 1 sack, 1 forced fumble, 1 pass defensed, and 1 blocked kick in a Week 1, 38–10 loss against the Philadelphia Eagles. But Peppers went without a sack during the next two games against the Atlanta Falcons and Dallas Cowboys, both losses as the Panthers started the season 0–3, causing Panthers linebacker Jon Beason to question Peppers' intensity on a radio show in Charlotte, North Carolina. Beason would later admit that he was wrong about saying this about Peppers and said he thought that Julius would go down as one of the best players to ever play in the NFL.

Peppers bounced back in Week 5 of the 2009 season against the Washington Redskins by recording 5 tackles, 2 sacks, and along with the help of Panthers linebacker Thomas Davis, tackled Redskins Running Back Clinton Portis in the end zone for a safety. Peppers helped the Panthers to their first win of the season defeating Washington 20–17. In Week 8, in a 34–21 win against the Arizona Cardinals, Peppers recorded 2 tackles, 1 sack, 1 forced fumble, 1 interception for a 13-yard touchdown, and 1 pass defensed earning him his third NFC Defensive Player of the Week Award. In Week 9, in a 30–20 loss against the New Orleans Saints, Peppers broke his right hand, but continued to play with a cast on his hand over the next few games.

In Week 15 against the Minnesota Vikings, Julius Peppers played one of his best games of his career, although only recording 1 tackle, 1 sack, and 1 pass defensed, Peppers also had 5 quarterback hurries and was all over the field, causing sports writer Peter King to say that Peppers looked like Lawrence Taylor and Deacon Jones rolled into one dominant force.

Peppers played so well he caused Vikings Pro Bowl left tackle Bryant McKinnie to be benched by Vikings head coach Brad Childress. Peppers' effectiveness not only prompted Childress to switch tackles, but to also consider making a quarterback change, which Vikings quarterback Brett Favre strongly resisted. Childress said he wanted to protect Favre, who he said was getting his rear end kicked and was taking a beating. In Week 17, which came on January 3, 2010, in a 23–10 win against the New Orleans Saints played at Bank of America Stadium in Charlotte, North Carolina, Julius Peppers played in his final game as a member of the Carolina Panthers during his first stint with the team. Peppers recorded 3 tackles, 1 interception, and 1 pass defensed. The interception Peppers recorded was, at the time, thought to be the final play of his Panthers career, but Peppers would eventually return to his home state team before the 2017 NFL season. Julius finished the season with 36 solo tackles, 6 assisted tackles, 10.5 sacks, 5 forced fumbles, 1 fumble recovery, 2 interceptions, 5 passes defensed, 3 stuffs, 1 blocked kick, and 1 defensive touchdown.

Peppers was voted to his fifth Pro Bowl and also earned Second-Team All Pro honors. On February 22, 2010, Adam Schefter reported that the Panthers would not place the franchise tag on Peppers, leaving him an unrestricted free agent, free to pursue a contract with another team.

Chicago Bears

2010 season
On March 5, 2010, the Chicago Bears signed Peppers to a six-year contract worth $91.5 million, with $42 million guaranteed in the first three years. Peppers made an immediate impact in Week 1 vs. the Detroit Lions by sacking quarterback Matthew Stafford and forcing a fumble with 29 seconds to go in the first half. The hit Peppers put on Stafford knocked him out for the remainder of the game.

In Week 3 against the Packers on Monday Night Football, Peppers recorded just two tackles, but was a thorn in the side of the Packers offensive line and Quarterback Aaron Rodgers all game long, forcing multiple false start and holding penalties, and hurrying Rodgers in the pocket all game long. Peppers also blocked a field goal that ultimately would prove to be the difference in the game as the Bears went on to defeat the Packers by 3 points by a score of 20–17.

In Week 5, Peppers went back to his home state to play against his former team, the Carolina Panthers, a game in which he and the Bears won by a score of 23–6. His biggest play of the game was when he tipped a Jimmy Clausen pass and proceeded to intercept it, by diving underneath the ball, after the play, Peppers proceeded to hush the booing crowd by raising his index finger to his lips. Peppers finished the game with 4 tackles, 1 interception, and 1 pass defensed.

In Week 11 against the Miami Dolphins, Peppers recorded his first three-sack performance as a member of the Chicago Bears, he finished the game with 6 tackles, 3 sacks, and 1 pass deflection that was intercepted. He earned the fourth NFC Defensive Player of the Week Award of his career for his efforts. Peppers would also win the NFC Defensive Player of the Month Award for November 2010 making it the third time in his career he earned the award.

Peppers finished the season with 43 solo tackles, 11 assisted tackles, 8 sacks, 3 forced fumbles, 2 interceptions, 9 passes defensed, 5 stuffs, and 1 blocked kick. His impact was most felt with regards to putting pressure on opposing quarterbacks, redirecting running plays, or assisting on the tackle. Julius was voted to his sixth Pro Bowl and was named to his third, First-Team All Pro team. Peppers also finished fourth in voting for the NFL's 2010 AP Defensive Player of the Year Award, which was won by Pittsburgh Steelers safety Troy Polamalu.

In Peppers first year as a Bear, he helped them make the playoffs for the first time since the 2006 season, and helped the Bears secure a victory over the Seattle Seahawks in the divisional round by a score of 35–24. Peppers and the Bears came within one game of reaching the Super Bowl, but ultimately lost to the Green Bay Packers in the NFC championship game 21–14.

In his 2010 All-Pro Team column, sportswriter Peter King wrote:

2011 season
Peppers improved on his 2010 season in 2011 starting all 16 games and leading the Bears defense with 11 sacks despite facing constant double teams, and also playing much of the season with a sprained MCL in his left knee that he injured in Week 5 against the Detroit Lions. But Peppers was still able to record 33 solo tackles, 4 assisted tackles, 11 sacks, 3 forced fumbles, 2 fumble recoveries, 4 passes defensed, 6 stuffs, and 2 blocked kicks. Peppers was awarded his fourth career NFC Defensive player of the month award for November as he collected 6 tackles, 4 sacks, and 3 pass breakups. In Week 17 facing the Vikings, Peppers was awarded a .5 sack by the league, that he originally split with fellow Bears defensive lineman Matt Toeaina, giving him his 100th career sack making him the twenty eighth player in NFL history to achieve that milestone. For his efforts Peppers was elected to the Pro Bowl which was the seventh of his career.

2012 season
During the 2012 season, Peppers played with plantar fasciitis, though he was able to record 11.5 sacks on the season, becoming the first Bears player to record ten sacks or more in back-to-back years since Rosevelt Colvin, and the first Bear to record at least 11 sacks in two consecutive seasons since Richard Dent. Peppers also recovered a career-high four fumbles, which tied for the league lead.

In Week 16, in a 28–13 win against the Arizona Cardinals, Peppers recorded 5 tackles, 3 sacks, 1 stuff, 1 forced fumble, and 1 pass defensed making it the ninth time in his career that he had recorded at least three sacks in a game, for his efforts Peppers earned his fifth career NFC Defensive Player of the Week Award. Peppers finished the season with 32 solo tackles, 7 assisted tackles, 11.5 sacks, 1 forced fumble, 4 fumble recoveries, 2 passes defensed, 3 stuffs, and 1 blocked kick. He was named to the 2013 Pro Bowl, his fifth consecutive, and eighth of his career, and was also selected to the NFL's 2012 All-Pro Second Team. Peppers also received the Bears Brian Piccolo Award given annually to the player that best exemplifies the courage, loyalty, teamwork, dedication and sense of humor of the late Bears running back Brian Piccolo.

On June 5, 2013 Profootballtalk.com named Julius Peppers to their Carolina Panthers Mount Rushmore as one of the teams most significant players in franchise history. On July 31, 2013 EA Tiburon revealed that Peppers was named to their "Madden NFL All-25 Team."

2013 season
During the Chicago Bears 2013 training camp, Peppers said after one of the Bears practices that he felt 25 years old, and that he wanted to win the first Deacon Jones Award, which was to be given to the player that led the league in sacks. In Week 3 of the 2013 NFL season in a game against the Pittsburgh Steelers, Peppers returned a fumble recovery 42 yards for a Bears touchdown with under four minutes remaining in the game to help seal a Bears victory by a score of 40–23. It was the second fumble recovery Peppers had returned for a touchdown in his career, as well as his fourth touchdown scored. In the Bears Week 11 game against the Baltimore Ravens, Peppers recorded a career-high 11 tackles as well as two sacks and two more tackles for loss in helping the Bears defeat the Ravens in overtime by a score of 23–20. Peppers finished the season with 31 solo tackles, 14 assisted tackles, seven sacks, two forced fumbles, one fumble recovery, one interception, three passes defensed, two stuffs, and one defensive touchdown.

On March 11, 2014, Peppers was released by the Chicago Bears after attempts to trade him were unsuccessful.

Green Bay Packers

2014 season

Peppers signed a three-year deal with the Green Bay Packers on March 15, 2014. The deal was worth $30 million with $8.5 million in first year, and $7.5 million guaranteed.

In Week 3 of the 2014 NFL season, Peppers recorded his first sack as a Green Bay Packer and also recorded his 40th career forced fumble and 15th career fumble recovery on the same play. It happened in a losing effort against the Detroit Lions by a score of 19–7. In Week 5 of the 2014 NFL season Peppers recorded his tenth career interception and raced across the field and down the sideline 49 yards to score the fifth touchdown of his career. In doing so, Peppers became the first player in NFL history to record at least 100 sacks and 10 interceptions, he also recorded 3 assisted tackles 1 being for a loss of yards, a pass defensed, and a half-sack in helping the Packers defeat the Minnesota Vikings by a score of 42–10. For his efforts against the Vikings, Peppers was named the NFC defensive player of the week for the sixth time in his career, making him along with Chris Doleman the only two players to win the award with three different teams.

Peppers also became the first player since sacks became an official statistic in 1982 to record at least a half-sack and an interception-return touchdown in three different games.  Peppers recorded 4 tackles, 2 passes defensed, and a sack, forced fumble, and fumble recovery on the same play against Bears quarterback Jay Cutler. The Packers blew out Peppers' former team by a score of 55–14.

In Week 11, Peppers recorded 2 tackles and his 11th career interception which he returned 52 yards for a touchdown, becoming the first player in NFL history to record at least 100 sacks and 4 interception-return touchdowns. It was Peppers sixth career touchdown scored including both interceptions and fumble recoveries returned. The Packers defeated the Philadelphia Eagles 53–20.

Peppers finished the season with 29 solo tackles, 15 assisted tackles, 7 sacks, 4 forced fumbles, 3 fumble recoveries, 2 interceptions, 2 defensive touchdowns, 11 passes defensed, and 4 stuffs.
 Peppers also ranked first among all linebackers and defensive linemen in the NFL with 101 interception return yards.
In the Divisional playoff game against the Dallas Cowboys, Peppers would have a dominant performance by leading the Packers in tackles on the day with 6, sacking Dallas quarterback Tony Romo and forcing a fumble on the third play of the game, then drew a holding penalty, and later forced a fumble of running back DeMarco Murray in the third quarter that the Packers recovered and prevented what looked like a clear run to the end zone for Murray. It was yet another game changing play made by Peppers, who has made plays such as this all throughout his outstanding career, and has been one of the biggest playmakers in NFL history as a game wrecking dominant defensive force, the likes of which the NFL hasn't seen since the days of Lawrence Taylor and Reggie White. The Packers went on to defeat the Cowboys 26–21.

The Packers would advance to play the Seattle Seahawks in the NFC Championship Game. Peppers would put on another dominant playoff performance by recording 5 tackles, 1.5 sacks, 3 quarterback hits, and put much pressure on Seahawks quarterback Russell Wilson throughout the game, but ultimately the Packers would fall short in overtime by a score of 28–22.

2015 season
Peppers started his fourteenth NFL season off with a bang against his former team, the Chicago Bears. Peppers recorded 6 tackles and 1.5 sacks on the day and in doing so passed former Kansas City Chiefs great Derrick Thomas for fifteenth most sacks in NFL history, as well as helping the Packers defeat the Bears by a score of 31–23.

In Week 15 against the Oakland Raiders, Peppers recorded 4 tackles and 2.5 sacks which moved him past fellow North Carolina alumni and former New York Giants legendary linebacker Lawrence Taylor into tenth place on the all-time NFL sacks list, giving him 135 career sacks. The Packers beat the Raiders by a score of 30–20.

Peppers finished the season with 25 solo tackles, 12 assisted tackles, 10.5 sacks, and 2 stuffs. He was also selected to his ninth career Pro Bowl.

Peppers helped the Packers reach the playoffs and win their wild card round playoff game against the Washington Redskins by a score of 35–18, he had several quarterback pressures and 2 tackles in the game. In the next round against the Arizona Cardinals, Peppers would record several more quarterback pressures and a sack, but the Packers would go on to lose the game in overtime 26–20.

2016 season
Before the season started, the top three living NFL sack leaders of all time, Bruce Smith, Kevin Greene, and Chris Doleman all said that Julius Peppers should be a Hall of Famer once he retires.

In Week 13, Peppers sacked Texans quarterback Brock Osweiler, moving into the top five on the NFL's all-time sack list with 142.5, passing former New York Giants Hall of Fame Defensive End Michael Strahan for fifth place. Peppers finished the game with 5 tackles and 1 sack, helping the Packers defeat the Texans by a score of 21–13. In Week 15 against his former team the Chicago Bears, Peppers recorded 4 tackles, a sack, a forced fumble, and a fumble recovery on the first play of the second half to help the Packers win by a score of 30–27.

Peppers finished the season with 15 solo tackles, 8 assisted tackles, 7.5 sacks, 2 forced fumbles, 1 fumble recovery, 3 passes defensed, and 1 stuff.

In the NFC wild card playoff round against the New York Giants, Peppers sacked Giants quarterback Eli Manning in the first half on a third down play to force a Giants punt. Peppers also ended another Giants drive on third down when he batted a pass that was nearly intercepted, and another on a later play by hitting Eli Manning just as he released the pass, causing an incompletion. Peppers finished the game with 3 tackles, 1 sack, 2 quarterback hits, and 2 passes defended helping the Packers beat the Giants by a score of 38–13 and advance to the divisional playoff round against the Dallas Cowboys. Peppers helped beat the Cowboys the following week 34–31, but the Packers lost a week later to the Atlanta Falcons in the NFC championship game 44–21.

Carolina Panthers (second stint)

2017 season
On March 10, 2017, Peppers signed a one-year contract to return to the Carolina Panthers. Peppers stated that while he was away from his home state of North Carolina and his home state team, and team that drafted him, the Carolina Panthers, he realized how much he missed the place saying "home is where the heart is." He also said he always wanted to return to the Panthers and repair the relationships with the team and fans and give them another chance to see him wear the Panthers uniform once again. Peppers was given the jersey #90, which was the same number he wore for the first eight years of his career while playing for the Carolina Panthers.

In week 1 of the 2017 NFL season, and Peppers first game back as a member of the Panthers, Peppers recorded a half sack and 2 QB hits in helping the Panthers beat the 49ers by a score of 23-3. In week 2 and in Peppers homecoming game in Charlotte, North Carolina at Bank of America Stadium, Peppers would be the last player to be introduced to the crowd as he came out of the tunnel to a huge standing ovation, excited to be back playing for his home state team, and team that drafted him with the second pick in the 2002 NFL draft. It had been nearly eight years since the Panthers legend had suited up for his home state team in Charlotte, and he was ready to put on a show for the home crowd, and the 37 year old future Hall of Famer did just that, having a great performance by recoding 6 tackles and 2 sacks in helping to shut down the Buffalo Bills running game, and helping to harass Bills QB Tyrod Taylor all game long. It was a special day for North Carolina's prodigal son as he helped the Panthers defeat the Bills by a score of 9-3. After the game Peppers would go on to say that this defense is the best he's ever been a part of.

In week 4, Peppers helped the Panthers defeat the New England Patriots 33-30. Peppers had another dominant performance recording 4 tackles, 2 sacks, 3 QB hits, and nearly had another sack and forced fumble right before halftime as he helped to disrupt Patriots quarterback Tom Brady, (who suffered an ac joint sprain in his left shoulder on one of Peppers sacks, but was able to finish the game) and the New England offense throughout the game, despite playing through a right shoulder injury of his own that he had in a brace. For his efforts, Peppers was named the NFC Defensive Player of The Week for the seventh time in his storied career. In Week 5, Peppers recorded a sack of Lions quarterback Matthew Stafford and also had a big 4th down tackle for a 4-yard loss which resulted in a turnover on downs. The Panthers would defeat the Lions by a score of 27–24. In Week 6 against the Philadelphia Eagles, Peppers recorded his 150th career sack, making him the fifth player in NFL history to achieve that milestone. He also forced a fumble on the same play, which gave him 48 career forced fumbles and tied him for second most all time with former Defensive End John Abraham. However, the Panthers lost 28–23. In Week 8 win against Tampa Bay, Peppers recorded his 151st sack, moving him past Chris Doleman for fourth most all-time. Peppers also recorded his 49th career forced fumble on the same play, which moved him into sole possession of second place on the all-time forced fumbles list. The sack also gave Peppers 7.5 sacks for the season, tying him with Bruce Smith for the most seasons with at least 7 sacks (15). In Week 15 against the Green Bay Packers, Peppers recorded a half sack late in the fourth quarter on a fourth down play against quarterback Aaron Rodgers, helping the Panthers ultimately win 31–24. The half sack gave Peppers 10 sacks on the season and 10 total seasons with double digit sacks, becoming only the fourth player in NFL history to achieve that milestone. Peppers also became only the third player in NFL history at age 37 or older to record at least 10 sacks in a season.

Peppers finished the season with 21 solo tackles, 12 assisted tackles, 11 sacks, 2 forced fumbles, 2 fumble recoveries, and 3 stuffs.

Peppers helped the Panthers make the playoffs, and they faced off against the New Orleans Saints in the wild card round. Peppers would record 2 tackles in the game including a huge tackle for loss on third down with 2:27 remaining in the fourth quarter. The Saints would go for it on fourth down and Saints' quarterback Drew Brees would throw an interception thereby giving the Panthers offense one more chance to win the game, but the Panthers offense was unable to score, causing the Panthers to lose by a score of 31–26.

2018 season
On March 14, 2018, Peppers signed a one-year contract extension with the Panthers.

In week 6 against the Washington Redskins, Peppers recorded a sack and a forced fumble which gave him 50 forced fumbles for his career. Peppers is only the second player in NFL history to record at least 50 forced fumbles, the first being Robert Mathis. The Panthers would lose the game though 17-23. In week 7 against the Eagles, Peppers recorded a sack and forced fumble on fourth down late in the fourth quarter to seal the victory for the Panthers by a score of 21-17. In week 17 against the New Orleans Saints, in what would be his last NFL game, Peppers would have yet another dominant performance, one of many in his Hall of Fame worthy career. Peppers recorded 4 solo tackles, 1 sack, 2 other tackles for loss, and 1 pass defensed as he looked to be all over the field in helping to defeat the Saints by a score of 33-14.

Peppers finished the season with 14 solo tackles, 8 assisted tackles, 5 sacks, 2 forced fumbles, 1 fumble recovery, 6 passes defensed, and 3 stuffs.

After a 17-year career in the NFL, Peppers announced his retirement on February 1, 2019. Peppers finished his legendary NFL career with 716 total tackles and 159.5 sacks (fourth most all-time - trailing only Bruce Smith (200), Reggie White (198) and Kevin Greene (160). He sacked 77 different quarterbacks, tied with Hall of Famer Reggie White for the most since sacks became official in 1982. Peppers recorded at least one sack against 30 of the NFL’s 32 franchises. The exceptions were the Bengals (three games against) and the Colts (four games against). He also had 51 forced fumbles (second most all-time) 21 fumble recoveries, 11 interceptions, 82 passes defensed, 6 defensive touchdowns scored (four interceptions returned, and two fumble recoveries) 60 stuffs, and 13 blocked kicks (second most all-time). He played in 266 of a possible 272 games in his career - the sixth most games played by a defensive player in NFL history.

Post-playing career
On May 8, 2019, Peppers was hired as a special assistant of business operations with the Carolina Panthers.

NFL career statistics

Regular season

Postseason

NFL awards and honors

NFL Rookie of the Month (10/02)
2002 NFL Defensive Rookie of the Year
Pro Football Weekly All-Rookie Team (2002)
2004 NFC Defensive Player of the Year
2004 NFL Alumni Defensive Lineman of the Year
2013 Brian Piccolo Award
2018 Panthers' Ed Block Courage Award
NFL 2000s All Decade Team
Pro-Football-Reference All 2000s Team
100 Sacks Club
2004, 2005, 2006, 2008, 2009, 2010, 2011, 2012, 2015 NFC Pro Bowl
2004, 2006, 2010 All-Pro First Team
2008, 2009, 2012 All-Pro Second Team
Seven time NFC Defensive Player of the Week (11/13/06, 11/9/08, 11/1/09, 11/18/10, 12/23/12, February 10, 2014, January 10, 2017)
Four time NFC Defensive Player of the Month (11/2004, 10/2006, 11/2010, 11/2011)

Panthers franchise records
Most career sacks: (97)
Most career forced fumbles: (34)
Longest Interception return: 97 yards (against the Denver Broncos on 10/10/04)

NFL records and accomplishments
Fourth most sacks in NFL history: 159.5
Tied for third most double digit sack seasons in NFL history: 10 
Tied for fifth most games with at least three sacks: 9
Tied for fifth most multiple sack games in NFL history: 37
Second most forced fumbles in NFL history: 51
Second most interceptions by a defensive lineman in NFL history: 9  
11 career interceptions including time played as a linebacker
Most interception return yards by a defensive lineman in NFL history: 192 yds 
293 career interception return yards including time played as a linebacker
Most interception return yards in a single season by a defensive lineman in NFL history: 143 yds
Most interception return yards in a single game by a defensive lineman in NFL history: 97 yds
Longest interception return by a defensive lineman in NFL history: 97 yds
Most combined interception and fumble return yards by a defensive lineman in a single season since NFL merger in 1970: 203 yds
Tied for second most interceptions returned for a touchdown by a defensive lineman in NFL history: 2  
4 career interceptions returned for a touchdown including time played as a linebacker 
Second most passes defensed by a defensive lineman in NFL history: 68  
82 career passes defensed including time played as a linebacker
Second most blocked kicks in NFL history: 13
Only player in NFL history to record at least 100 sacks and 10 interceptions
Only player in NFL history with 100-plus sacks and four interceptions returned for touchdowns
Only player in NFL history to record at least 150 sacks and 10 interceptions 
Peppers has three career games with at least a half-sack and an interception-return touchdown, the most such games in the NFL since the sack became an official statistic in 1982

Television 

Julius Peppers' name was the basis for the character "Julius Pepperwood", written by Nick Miller in the show New Girl.

Personal life
In February 2009, Peppers donated $500,000 to a scholarship program that supports black students at his alma mater of North Carolina. His donation would go to the Light on the Hill Society Scholarship, a tribute to UNC's earliest black graduates which helps alumni and friends support black freshmen who show the potential for academic excellence at UNC and after they graduate.

References

External links
 
 North Carolina Tar Heels bio
 Carolina Panthers bio
 Chicago Bears bio 
 Green Bay Packers bio

1980 births
Living people
African-American basketball players
African-American players of American football
All-American college football players
American football defensive ends
American sportspeople in doping cases
Basketball players from Charlotte, North Carolina
Carolina Panthers players
Chicago Bears players
Doping cases in American football
Green Bay Packers players
National Conference Pro Bowl players
National Football League Defensive Rookie of the Year Award winners
North Carolina Tar Heels football players
North Carolina Tar Heels men's basketball players
People from Nash County, North Carolina
People from Wilson, North Carolina
Players of American football from Charlotte, North Carolina
Unconferenced Pro Bowl players
American men's basketball players
21st-century African-American sportspeople
20th-century African-American people
100 Sacks Club
Ed Block Courage Award recipients
Brian Piccolo Award winners